Toni Domgjoni (born 4 September 1998) is a professional footballer who plays as a midfielder for Dutch club Vitesse. Born in Croatia to Kosovan parents and raised in Switzerland, Domgjoni plays for the Kosovo national team.

Club career

Early career and Zürich
Domgjoni at the age of eight started playing football in Slaven Belupo, he during the 2007–08 season was part of Koprivnica, where after the end of the season he returned again to Slaven Belupo until 2009, where he joins the Swiss club Zürich and played with the youth age group, as well as with the U16 and U18 teams. In July 2016, Domgjoni was promoted to the U21 team and on 28 August, he made his debut in a 0–3 away defeat against Old Boys after coming on as a substitute at 46th minute in place of Izer Aliu.

On 11 February 2018, Domgjoni was named as a Zürich's first team substitute for the first time in a Swiss Super League match against St. Gallen. His debut with Zürich came on 17 March against Young Boys after being named in the starting line-up. Fourteen days after debut, Domgjoni scored his first goal for Zürich in his second appearance for the club in a 1–1 away draw over Sion in Swiss Super League.

On 22 May 2018, Zürich decided to offer Domgjoni a professional contract after his good performances and the parties agreed on a three-year contract. Five days later, he played the first match as professional player in the 2017–18 Swiss Cup final against Young Boys after starting the match before being substituted off due to injury in the 46th minute for Sangoné Sarr.

Vitesse
On 25 May 2021, Domgjoni signed a three-year contract with Eredivisie club Vitesse. On 5 August 2021, he was named as a Vitesse substitute for the first time in a 2021–22 UEFA Europa Conference League third qualifying round against Dundalk. His debut with Vitesse came seven days later in the 2021–22 UEFA Europa Conference League third qualifying round again against Dundalk after coming on as a substitute at 83rd minute in place of Danilho Doekhi. Ten days after debut, Domgjoni made his league debut in a 0–3 home defeat against Willem II after being named in the starting line-up.

International career

Youth
From 2016, until 2021, Domgjoni has been part of Switzerland at youth international level, respectively has been part of the U18, U19, U20 and U21 teams and he with these teams played 25 matches and scored one goal.

Senior
On 1 October 2021, the Football Federation of Kosovo announced that Domgjoni had decided to represent their national team and was awaiting permission from FIFA to play for their national team. The same day later, he received a call-up from Kosovo for the 2022 FIFA World Cup qualification matches against Sweden and Georgia, and six days after the call-up, FIFA allows him to play for Kosovo. His debut with Kosovo came on 24 March 2022 in a friendly match against Burkina Faso after being named in the starting line-up and scored his side's fifth goal during a 5–0 home win.

Personal life
Domgjoni was born in Koprivnica, Croatia and raised in Zürich, Switzerland to Kosovo Albanian parents from the village Bishtazhin of Gjakova.

Career statistics

Club

International

References

External links

1998 births
Living people
Sportspeople from Koprivnica
Kosovan footballers
Kosovo international footballers
Swiss men's footballers
Switzerland youth international footballers
Switzerland under-21 international footballers
Swiss people of Kosovan descent
Swiss people of Albanian descent
Croatian footballers
Croatian emigrants to Switzerland
Croatian people of Kosovan descent
Croatian people of Albanian descent
Association football midfielders
Swiss Super League players
FC Zürich players
Eredivisie players
SBV Vitesse players